Ran GTPase-activating protein 1 is an enzyme that in humans is encoded by the RANGAP1 gene.

Function 

RanGAP1, is a homodimeric 65-kD polypeptide that specifically induces the GTPase activity of RAN, but not of RAS by over 1,000-fold. RanGAP1 is the immediate antagonist of RCC1, a regulator molecule that keeps RAN in the active, GTP-bound state. The RANGAP1 gene encodes a 587-amino acid polypeptide. The sequence is unrelated to that of GTPase activators for other RAS-related proteins, but is 88% identical to Rangap1 (Fug1), the murine homolog of yeast Rna1p. RanGAP1 and RCC1 control RAN-dependent transport between the nucleus and cytoplasm. RanGAP1 is a key regulator of the RAN GTP/GDP cycle.

Interactions 

RanGAP1 is a trafficking protein which helps transport other proteins from the cytoplasm to the nucleus. Small ubiquitin-related modifier needs to be associated with it before it can be localized at the nuclear pore.

RANGAP1 has been shown to interact with:
 Ran,  and
 UBE2I.

References

Further reading